Justin Bryant (born August 24, 1966 in Melbourne, Florida) is an American writer and former soccer goalkeeper.

Youth and college
Bryant grew up in Florida, and attended Radford University in Radford, Virginia.  While at Radford, he played on the men's soccer team from 1984 to 1986.

Soccer
Bryant elected to pursue a career as a professional soccer goalkeeper.  In 1987, he moved to England and signed with Boreham Wood FC. He made his debut in a 3–0 win against Leatherhead on March 12. While playing for Borehamwood, he had an extended trial at Brentford FC and played as a trialist in several friendlies. He returned to the U.S. that same year to play for the Orlando Lions of the recently established American Soccer League.  In 1989, he moved to Scotland to play for Dunfermline Athletic but was unable to obtain a work permit. In 1990, he returned to Boreham Wood FC, where he made 23 appearances for the reserve team.  In 1995, he spent a single season with the Cocoa Expos in the U.S., making over 20 first-team appearances. The Expos reached the USISL Premier League final, where they lost 3–1 to the Richmond Kickers.

Writing
In 1996, Bryant decided to give up his playing career, and moved to Elon College and completed his bachelor's degree in English. The college then hired him as the assistant coach for the women's soccer team.  Based on an idea for a book he had conceived while visiting his father in South Africa, he wrote a novel, Season of Ash, published in 2004 by ENC Press, and has continued to write, producing short fiction published in such literary journals as Thin Air, Chiron Review, The Rockhurst Review, and Snowbound. His work has also been anthologized by Gorsky Press, Spotted Cow Press, and Key Porter Books. He has written about soccer for XI Quarterly, The Howler Magazine, Green Pitch Magazine, Red Issue, and Bookable Offense. He is a graduate of the MFA Creative Writing program at New York University, where he did his thesis with E. L. Doctorow. He currently writes a column in Goalkeeper Magazine. In June 2013, Bryant published his second book, the autobiographical "Small Time: A Life in the Football Wilderness", documenting his travails as a young, professional goalkeeper. He lives in Raleigh, NC with his partner Sarah and their two rescue dogs, Roxy and Bryce.

External links
 Bio page at ENC Press
 Bio page at Freebird Writing Workshops in Brooklyn
 2012 Audio Interview With XI Quarterly Magazine
 1995 Radio Interview
 Small Time: A Life in the Football Wilderness
 Small Time: 2013 Interview with Sky Sports Magazine
 NC State Bio

21st-century American novelists
American historical novelists
1966 births
Living people
American soccer players
Association football goalkeepers
American Soccer League (1988–89) players
Orlando Lions players
Cocoa Expos players
American soccer coaches
Boreham Wood F.C. players
Radford University alumni
New York University alumni
American male novelists
21st-century American male writers
Radford Highlanders men's soccer players